These are things named after Ernst Witt, a German mathematician.
 Bourbaki–Witt theorem
 Hall–Witt identity
 Hasse–Witt matrix
Hasse–Witt invariant
 Poincaré–Birkhoff–Witt theorem, usually known as the PBW theorem
 Shirshov–Witt theorem
 Witt algebra
 Witt decomposition
 Witt design (Witt geometry)
 Witt group
 Witt index
 Witt polynomial
 Witt ring
Grothendieck-Witt ring
 Witt scheme
 Witt's theorem
 Witt vector
Witt vector cohomology

Witt